Acineta chrysantha is a species of orchid found in the forest of Guatemala, El Salvador, Costa Rica and Panama.

References

External links
 
 

chrysantha
Orchids of Costa Rica
Orchids of El Salvador
Orchids of Guatemala
Orchids of Panama